Joseph A. Craig High School is a public high school located in the city of Janesville, Wisconsin. Craig, a part of the School District of Janesville, has a student enrollment of approximately 1,800. Located on the east side of Janesville, it is named after Joseph A. Craig, who was instrumental in attracting the General Motors Janesville Assembly Plant to the city.

History

The original building, simply known as Janesville High School, was opened in 1955. The school was later renamed Joseph A. Craig High School in 1967 with the opening of George S. Parker High School on the west side of Janesville.

Athletics
The school sports teams compete in the Big Eight Conference. State level competition is governed by the Wisconsin Interscholastic Athletic Association (WIAA).

State championships
 Baseball: 1983, 1984, 1998, 2015
 Cross country (girls): 1991

as Janesville High School
 Cross country (boys): 1950, 1961, 1962
 Golf (boys): 1951, 1953, 1963
 Swimming & diving (boys): 1955, 1961
 Wrestling: 1955 (co-state champion with Madison East)

Performing arts
Craig has two competitive show choirs, the varsity-level "Spotlighters" and the junior varsity-level "Illuminations". The choirs also host their own competition, the Spotlight Spectacular. Spotlighters have a history of placing well at competitions, even winning some championships.

Notable alumni
 Edward Creutz, physicist
 Russ Feingold, United States Senator (1993–2011)
 Tucker Fredricks, speed skater
 Israel Hanukoglu, biochemist
 Tom Klawitter, professional baseball player
 Tad Kubler, lead guitarist for rock band The Hold Steady
 Kerwin Mathews, actor
 Max Maxfield, Wyoming State Auditor (1999–2007) and 20th Secretary of State of Wyoming (2007–2015)
 John E. McCoy, Major General, Air National Guard 
 Andrew Poppas , General, Army
 Manilla Powers, actress, vaudevillian
 Paul Ryan, 54th Speaker of the United States House of Representatives (2015-2019) and U.S. Representative (1999–2019)
 Bob Strampe, professional baseball player
 Bryan Steil, Member of the U.S. House of Representatives (2019 to present)

References

External links

 Craig High School home page
 School District of Janesville
 City of Janesville

Educational institutions established in 1954
Public high schools in Wisconsin
Schools in Rock County, Wisconsin
1954 establishments in Wisconsin